David Hungate (born August 5, 1948) is an American bass guitarist noted as a member of the Los Angeles pop-rock band Toto from 1976 to 1982 and again from 2014 to 2015, and the son of judge William L. Hungate. Along with most of his Toto bandmates, Hungate did sessions on a number of hit albums of the 1970s, including Boz Scaggs's Silk Degrees and Alice Cooper's From the Inside.

Career
Hungate played on Toto's first four records, including the Grammy award-winning album Toto IV. He left the band shortly after its release for a career as a session musician in Nashville. Hungate, who plays many instruments including guitar, trombone, trumpet, drums, and piano, has arranged, produced and recorded with several country artists such as Chet Atkins. He was also a primary member of AOR supergroup Mecca fronted by Joe Vana and Fergie Frederiksen, the latter also of Toto fame. In 1990 he released a solo album entitled Souvenir. Jeff Porcaro played drums on some of the tracks on the album. In 1995, Hungate also played bass on all the songs on Shania Twain's second album The Woman in Me.

, he rejoined Toto in a touring capacity due to the departure of the touring bass player, Nathan East (who was, like Leland Sklar during the band's previous tour in 2006/2007, filling in for regular bassist Mike Porcaro who was forced to retire due to illness). At first, it was announced that he would retire after the 2014 tour, but he kept touring with Toto until 2015, when it was announced that he would finally retire from extensive tours. He also played four tracks in the band's album Toto XIV.

Other

Hungate attended went to Troy Buchanan High School in Troy, Missouri. Because he attended there, the band "Toto" gave the high school a signed record and now during parades the band plays the song "Hold the Line".

He attended the College of Music at North Texas State University. He played bass in their jazz ensemble, the One O'Clock Lab Band, including a performance at the 1970 Montreux Jazz Festival. 

He is the son of U.S. Congressman (and later Federal District Judge) William L. Hungate.

Discography 
 Souvenir (1990) [reissued in 1994]

Collaborations 
With Amy Grant
 Never Alone (Myrrh Records, 1980)
 Home for Christmas (A&M Records, 1992)
 Somewhere Down the Road (EMI, 2010)

With Joe Cocker
 Civilized Man (Capitol Records, 1984)

With Sonny & Cher
 Mama Was a Rock and Roll Singer, Papa Used to Write All Her Songs (MCA Records, 1973)

With Boz Scaggs
 Silk Degrees (Columbia Records, 1976)
 Down Two Then Left (Columbia Records, 1977)
 Middle Man (Columbia Records, 1980)
 Other Roads (Columbia Records, 1988)
 Memphis (429 Records, 2013)
 Out of the Blues (Concord Records, 2018)

With Michael W. Smith
 Christmastime (Reunion, 1998)

With J. D. Souther
 Home By Dawn (Warner Bros. Records, 1984)

With Les Dudek
 Les Dudek (Columbia Records, 1976)

With Clay Walker
 Live, Laugh, Love (Giant, 1999)
 Christmas (Warner Bros. Records, 2002)

With Deniece Williams
 When Love Comes Calling (Columbia Records, 1978)

With Evie Sands
 Estate Of Mind (Haven Records, 1974)
 Suspended Animation (RCA Victor, 1979)

With Mandy Barnett
 Mandy Barnett (Asylum Records, 1996)

With Frankie Valli
 Heaven Above Me (MCA Records, 1980)

With Ronna Reeves
 What Comes Naturally (Mercury Records, 1992)

With Keane Brothers
 The Keane Brothers (20th Century Records, 1977)

With Michael Martin Murphey
 Cowboy Christmas: Cowboy Songs II (Warner Bros. Records, 1991)
 Cowboy Songs Four (Valley Entertainment, 1998)

With Helen Reddy
 Music, Music (Capitol Records, 1976)
 We'll Sing in the Sunshine (Capitol Records, 1978)

With Ricky Van Shelton
 Wild-Eyed Dream (Columbia Records, 1987)
 RVS III (Columbia Records, 1990)

With Neil Sedaka
 In the Pocket (Elektra Records, 1980)

With Seals and Crofts
 Unborn Child (Warner Bros. Records, 1974)
 Get Closer (Warner Bros. Records, 1976)

With Cliff DeYoung
 Cliff DeYoung (MCA Records, 1975)

With Mark Nesler
 I'm Just That Way (Asylum Records, 1998)

With Tanya Tucker
 Changes (Arista Records, 1982)
 Can't Run from Yourself (Liberty Records, 1992)
 Soon (Liberty Records, 1993)
 Fire to Fire (Liberty Records, 1995)

With Karen Alexander
 Isn't It Always Love (Asylum Records, 1976)

With Ronnie Milsap
 Keyed Up (RCA Records, 1983)
 Heart & Soul (RCA Records, 1987)
 Back to the Grindstone (RCA Records, 1991)
 True Believer (RCA Records, 1993)
 Just for a Thrill (Image Entertainment, 2004)

With Kim Carnes
 Romance Dance (EMI, 1980)

With Patti Dahlstrom
 Your Place or Mine (20th Century Records, 1975)

With Willie Nelson
 Remember Me, Vol. 1 (R&J Records, 2011)

With Michel Polnareff
 Michel Polnareff (Atlantic Records, 1975)

With Bill Quateman
 Just Like You (RCA Victor, 1979)

With Kevin Sharp
 Love Is (Asylum Records, 1998)

With Rickie Lee Jones
 The Magazine (Warner Bros. Records, 1984)

With Lesley Gore
 Love Me By Name (Asylum Records, 1976)

With Crystal Gayle
 True Love (Elektra Records, 1982)
 Cage the Songbird (Warner Bros. Records, 1983)
 Nobody Wants to Be Alone (Warner Bros. Records, 1985)

With Russ Ballard
 At the Third Stroke (Epic Records, 1978)

With Elliot Lurie
 Elliot Lurie (Epic Records, 1975)

With Rebecca Lynn Howard
 Rebecca Lynn Howard (Universal Music, 2000)

With Barbra Streisand
 Songbird (Columbia Records, 1978)
 Wet (Columbia Records, 1979)
 Guilty (Columbia Records, 1980)

With Olivia Newton-John
 Totally Hot (MCA Records, 1978)
 Physical (MCA Records, 1981)

With Diana Ross
 Baby It's Me (Motown Records, 1977)

With Joe Nichols
 Man with a Memory (Universal South Records, 2002)
 Revelation (Universal South Records, 2004)
 A Traditional Christmas (Universal South Records, 2004)
 III (Universal South Records, 2005)
 Real Things (Universal South Records, 2007)
 Old Things New (Universal South Records, 2009)

With Danniebelle Hall
 Let Me Have a Dream (Sparrow Records, 1977)

With Billy Preston
 The Way I Am (Motown, 1981)

With Bill LaBounty
 Back To Your Star (Chill Phill Records, 2009)

With Cheryl Wheeler
 Circles and Arrows (Philo, 1990)

With Ted Gärdestad
 Blue Virgin Isles (Polar, 1978)

With Mark Collie
 Born and Raised in Black & White (MCA Records, 1991)

With Livingston Taylor
 Three Way Mirror (Epic Records, 1978)

With Jeane Manson
 Stand by Me (CBS Records, 1980)

With Lisa Brokop
 Every Little Girl's Dream (Liberty Records, 1994)
 Lisa Brokop (Capitol Records, 1996)
 Hey, Do You Know Me (Curb Records, 2005)

With Dan Peek
 All Things Are Possible (Lamb & Lion Records, 1978)

With Anne Murray
 As I Am (Capitol Records, 1988)

With Jimmy Webb
 El Mirage (Atlantic Records, 1977)

With Eddie Rabbitt
 Loveline (Elektra Records, 1979)
 Horizon (Elektra Records, 1980)
 Step by Step (Elektra Records, 1981)
 Radio Romance (Warner Bros. Records, 1982)
 The Best Year of My Life (Warner Bros. Records, 1984)
 I Wanna Dance with You (RCA Records, 1988)
 Jersey Boy (Capitol Records, 1990)
 Ten Rounds (Liberty Records, 1991)

With John Sebastian
 Welcome Back (Reprise Records, 1976)

With Shania Twain
 The Woman in Me (Mercury Records, 1995)

With Emmylou Harris and Rodney Crowell
 Old Yellow Moon (Nonesuch Records, 2013)

With Chad Brock
 Chad Brock (Warner Bros. Records, 1998)

With Carole Bayer Sager
 ...Too (Elektra Records, 1978)

With Tracy Byrd
 Tracy Byrd (MCA Records, 1993)
 No Ordinary Man (MCA Records, 1994)

With Tim Moore
 White Shadows (Asylum Records, 1977)

With Lionel Cartwright
 Lionel Cartwright (MCA Records, 1989)

With Juice Newton
 Well Kept Secret (Capitol Records, 1978)
 The Trouble with Angels (River North Records, 1998)
 American Girl (Renaissance Records, 1999)

With Jackie DeShannon
 You're the Only Dancer (Amherst Records, 1977)

With Mark Chesnutt
 Almost Goodbye (MCA Records, 1993)

With The Manhattan Transfer
 Extensions (Atlantic Records, 1979)
 Swing (Atlantic Records, 1997)

With Minnie Riperton
 Minnie (Capitol Records, 1979)

With David Pomeranz
 It's in Every One of Us (Arista Records, 1975)

With Linda Ronstadt and Aaron Neville
 Cry Like a Rainstorm, Howl Like the Wind (Elektra Records, 1989)

With Melissa Manchester
 Don't Cry Out Loud (Arista Records, 1978)
 Joy (Angel Records, 1997)

With Barry Mann
 Barry Mann (Casablanca Records, 1980)

With Brooks & Dunn
 Borderline (Arista Records, 1996)
 If You See Her (Arista Records, 1998)

With Leah Kunkel
 I Run With Trouble (Columbia Records, 1980)

With Bette Midler
 Broken Blossom (Atlantic Records, 1977)

With Nils Lofgren
 Night Fades Away (MCA Records, 1981)

With Kiki Dee
 Stay With Me (Rocket, 1978)

With Leo Sayer
 Endless Flight (Chrysalis Records, 1976)
 Thunder in My Heart (Chrysalis Records, 1977)
 World Radio (Chrysalis Records, 1982)

With Kenny Nolan
 A Song Between Us (Polydor Records, 1978)

With Toby Keith
 Honkytonk University (DreamWorks Records, 2005)

With Judy Collins
 Hard Times for Lovers (Elektra Records, 1979)

With Kenny Marks
 Another Friday Night (DaySpring Records, 1989)

With Albert Hammond
 Your World and My World (Columbia Records, 1981)

With Cher
 Bittersweet White Light (MCA Records, 1973)
 I'd Rather Believe in You (Warner Bros. Records, 1976)
 Take Me Home (Casablanca Records, 1979)

With Nicolette Larson
 Rose of My Heart (MCA Records, 1986)

With Donovan
 Slow Down World (Epic Records, 1976)

With Bernie Taupin
 He Who Rides the Tiger (Elektra Records, 1980)

With Leslie Pearl
 Words & Music (RCA Records, 1982)

With Vince Gill
 Guitar Slinger (MCA Records, 2011)

With Johnny Rivers
 Outside Help (Big Tree Records, 1977)

With Nanci Griffith
 Little Love Affairs (MCA Records, 1988)

With Tavares
 Supercharged (Capitol Records, 1980)

With Glen Campbell
 Still Within the Sound of My Voice (MCA Records, 1987)
 Light Years (MCA Records, 1988)
 Walkin' in the Sun (Capitol Records, 1990)
 Show Me Your Way (New Heaven, 1991)
 Somebody Like That (Liberty Records, 1993)
 Home for the Holidays (New Heaven, 1993)

With Valerie Carter
 Wild Child (ARC, 1978)

With Barry Manilow
 One Voice (Arista Records, 1979)

With Dolly Parton
 Here You Come Again (RCA Victor, 1977)
 Heartbreaker (RCA Records, 1978)
 Dolly, Dolly, Dolly (RCA Victor, 1981)
 Something Special (Columbia Records, 1995)
 Treasures (Rising Tide Records, 1996)

With Lauren Wood
 Lauren Wood (Capitol Records, 1979)

With Dalbello
 Lisa Dal Bello (MCA Records, 1977)

With Marcia Hines
 Ooh Child (Miracle Records, 1979)

With José Feliciano
 Just Wanna Rock 'n' Roll (RCA Victor, 1975)

With Colin Blunstone
 Never Even Thought (Epic Records, 1978)

With Diana DeGarmo
 Blue Skies (RCA Records, 2004)

With Stephen Bishop
 Bish (ABC Records, 1978)

With Sarah Vaughan
 Songs of The Beatles (Atlantic Records, 1981)

With Kerry Chater
 Part Time Love (Warner Bros. Records, 1977)

With Neil Diamond
 Tennessee Moon (Columbia Records, 1996)

With Rosanne Cash
 Rhythm & Romance (Columbia Records, 1985)

With Alessi Brothers
 Driftin (A&M Records, 1978)With Collin Raye Can't Back Down (Epic Records, 2001)With Kenny Rogers'''
 Christmas (Liberty Records, 1981)
 I Prefer the Moonlight (RCA Records, 1987)
 Something Inside So Strong (Reprise Records, 1989)
 There You Go Again'' (Dreamcatcher Records, 2000)

References

External links 
 David Hungate featured page on the Party Of The Century international music project
 David Hungate: I'm so glad to be playing Toto music again!

1948 births
American country bass guitarists
American male bass guitarists
American rock bass guitarists
American session musicians
Living people
Place of birth missing (living people)
Toto (band) members
University of North Texas College of Music alumni
American male guitarists
20th-century American bass guitarists
20th-century American male musicians
21st-century American bass guitarists
21st-century American male musicians